Bas is both a given name and a surname. As a given name in Dutch it is short for Sebastiaan (Sebastian). Notable people with the name include:

Given name
Bas Balkissoon (born c. 1952), politician in Toronto, Canada
Bas van Bavel (born 1964), Dutch historian
Bas of Bithynia, (c. 397–326 BC), first independent ruler of Bithynia
Bas Bron, Dutch musical artist and producer of mostly electronic music
Bas de Gaay Fortman (born 1937), Dutch politician and scholar
Bas Giling (born 1982), Dutch professional road bicycle racer
Bas Jan Ader (1942–1975), Dutch conceptual artist, performance artist, photographer and filmmaker
Bas Leinders (born 1975), Belgian  racing driver
Bas Pease (1922–2004), British physicist
Bas Roorda (born 1973), Dutch football (soccer) goalkeeper
Bas Rutten (born 1965), Dutch mixed martial arts fighter and color commentator
Bas Savage (born 1982), English professional footballer (soccer)
Bas van de Goor (born 1971), Dutch volleyball player
Bas van der Vlies (born 1942), Dutch politician
Bas van Fraassen (born 1941), Netherlands-born American philosopher
Bas Oskam (born 1980), Dutch DJ

Surname
Bärbel Bas (born 1968), German politician
Bernardo Bas (born 1919), de facto Federal Interventor of Córdoba, Argentina
Cornelis Bas (1928–2013), Dutch mycologist
Giulio Bas (1874–1929), Italian organist and composer
Hernan Bas (born 1978), U.S. artist based in Florida
Noël Bas (1877–1960), French gymnast

Dutch masculine given names